Noah Falck (born April 23, 1977) is an American poet.

Life and work
Falck is the author of the poetry collections Exclusions (Tupelo Press, 2020) and SNOWMEN LOSING WEIGHT (BatCat Press, 2012).  His work has appeared in Boston Review, Kenyon Review, Harvard Review, Conduit, Ploughshares, and Poets.org,. His credits as editor include My Next Heart: New Buffalo Poetry (BlazeVOX[Books], 2017). He is the Education Director at Just Buffalo Literary Center, the premier center for the literary arts in the Buffalo/Niagara region.

Bibliography
Exclusions (Tupelo Press, 2020)
My Next Heart: New Buffalo Poetry, ed. (BlazeVOX[Books], 2017)
You Are In Nearly Every Future (Dostoyevsky Wannabe x, 2017)
Celebrity Dream Poems (Poor Claudia, 2013)
Snowmen Losing Weight (BatCat Press, 2012) 
Life As A Crossword Puzzle (Open Thread, 2009)
Measuring Tape For The Midwest (Pavement Saw, 2008)
Homemade Engines From A Dream (Pudding House Publications, 2007)

References

External links
 Official site

Writers from Dayton, Ohio
Poets from Ohio
1977 births
Living people
American male poets
21st-century American poets
21st-century American male writers